Daniel Alexander Slatkin (born May 16, 1994) is an American composer, conductor, multi-instrumentalist and music producer known for his film scores, television scores and concert works. At the age of 23, Slatkin's feature film debut was premiered at Grauman's Chinese Theatre, and five months later had his symphony orchestra debut with a concert work commissioned by the Detroit Symphony Orchestra.

Early life and education 
Daniel Slatkin was born in St. Louis, Missouri, to conductor and 7-time Grammy winner, Leonard Slatkin and Linda Hohenfeld, on May 16, 1994. The Slatkins are part of a Jewish musical family that came from areas of the Russian Empire now in Ukraine. His grandfather, violinist and conductor Felix Slatkin, was the founder of the Hollywood String Quartet and concertmaster of the Twentieth Century Fox Orchestra. His grandmother, Eleanor Aller, was the cellist of the quartet and principle cellist of the Warner Brothers Orchestra, becoming the first female to hold a principle chair in a Hollywood studio orchestra.

Slatkin was educated in the concert hall. He traveled throughout his youth while training classically in piano, watching his father perform on stages all over the world. Slatkin attended Brooks School where he began forming his musical voice, and during this time had his first professional performance as a pianist with the Detroit Symphony Orchestra at the age of 17. After high school, Slatkin attended the University of Southern California, studying business, music and film, where he discovered his love of setting music to the moving image.

Career 
Slatkin has followed in the footsteps of his family, achieving acclaim at an unusually young age. Slatkin's first feature film was premiered at Grauman's Chinese Theatre just after he turned 23, and his film music has since been heard around the world, from Netflix, to PBS, to Amazon Prime, to festivals, where his work has been nominated for best score. 

In 2022, Slatkin recorded the score for a feature film with the Detroit Symphony Orchestra in the Max M. Fisher Music Center. The film, about the Detroit bankruptcy, won the Library of Congress Lavine/Ken Burns Prize for Film. That same year, his score for independent feature film Neon Bleed won two Best Score awards, with the selections made by Roger Taylor of Queen and Alan Parsons. 

On the concert stage, Slatkin has had works commissioned and performed by the Detroit Symphony Orchestra, Manhattan School of Music Symphony Orchestra, Nashville Symphony, Orchestre National de Lyon, National Symphony Orchestra and St. Louis Symphony Orchestra. His recorded music has been broadcast internationally, with his most recent recording, In Fields, having been released in February 2022.

Personal life 
Slatkin resides in Los Angeles with his wife and business partner, Bridget Slatkin.

References

External links 

 
 

1994 births
Living people
21st-century American composers
21st-century American conductors (music)
University of Southern California alumni
Brooks School alumni